Eastland Mall was a two-level, enclosed shopping mall located in North Versailles, Pennsylvania, situated on  of land at the peak of a hill overlooking the Monongahela River. The mall was home to such stores as Gimbels,  J.C. Penney, F.W. Woolworth Company, and Gee Bee Department Stores. The mall annex also included a two screen movie theater and auto repair center.

Opening
The Gimbels department store chain began construction on Eastland Mall in 1961. After approximately two years of construction and $12 million of construction costs, Eastland Shopping Plaza opened on August 15, 1963. In addition to a  Gimbels, some of the nation's largest stores, J.C. Penney, National Record Mart, May-Stern, Kinney Shoes, Thom McAn, and F.W. Woolworth Company moved into the mall.  The first store to open was the Thorofare super market located at the western end of the plaza.

When Eastland Shopping Plaza opened, downtown McKeesport suffered as J.C. Penney moved from McKeesport into Eastland Shopping Plaza. Three other McKeesport retailers, Immel's, Wander Sales, and Richard's Shoes, opened stores in Eastland. At its peak in the 1960s, Eastland Shopping Plaza employed 800 people.

Decline
The upper level of Eastland was originally an open-air marketplace. After a fire destroyed much of the property and caused $1 million worth of damage on June 6, 1973, a roof was added and the entire mall was enclosed. At this time the "Shopping Plaza" in Eastland's name was changed to "Mall" and a Gee Bee discount store was opened.

Just six years after its opening Eastland faced competition from all-enclosed Monroeville Mall, then billed as the largest mall in the United States, located under six miles (10 km) away. Four years earlier, Eastland saw competition from South Hills Village, the country's largest (and first two-story) enclosed mall, in Upper St. Clair and Bethel Park. Greengate Mall (now Greengate Centre) in nearby Greensburg, Westmoreland County would also open the very same year as South Hills Village.

Furthermore, whereas these four malls were located in and around more affluent suburbs, Eastland was located primarily around old mill towns. Many of these communities lost vast amounts of population during the lifetime of the Eastland Mall. Braddock, which East Pittsburgh-McKeesport Blvd leads directly into two miles (3 km) away, had approximately 12,000 residents in 1963. By the mall's close in 2005 it had fewer than 3,000. This demographic change took with it potential customers and employees of Eastland Mall.

After Eastland Mall had already filed for Chapter 11 bankruptcy, its most devastating blow came in September 1986 when Gimbels, which had developed and owned the mall, went out of business, taking most of Eastland's tenants along with it. Benderson Development Company of Buffalo, NY purchased the mall from the bankrupt Gimbels department store two years later.

For the next 20 years Eastland tried to stay afloat with a variety of unique tenants - including a PennDOT state driver's license testing center, a beer distributor (Beer World, located in the old J.C. Penney's), a distribution center for Xerox, the local magistrate's office, a professional wrestling center (PWX, owned by James Miller), a bingo parlor (Eastland Social Hall Bingo), and a low power TV station, WBYD-CD. Most notable was the addition of a two-story indoor and spacious outdoor flea market in the space once occupied by Gimbels which, according to a flea market manager, drew 500 vendors and 2,000 customers per weekend at its peak.

Many smaller retail stores then opened inside the mall, including Harper's Bazaar (a mom-and-pop women's clothing store run by Jim and Carol Harper), Kennywood Messenger Service (a notary and vehicle licensing service), Amer-a-Quick printing service, a barber shop, and a beauty parlor. The revival was temporary. In the 1990s, the flea market was moved off to the side in the old Gee Bee store, taking foot traffic away from the retail stores located inside the mall.

The building then fell into a state of ruin. By the time the mall closed in 2005, it was only worth $1.38 million - less than the $1.4 million that Benderson Development Company paid for it 1988. By that point, trash cans holding water falling from the leaky roof abounded throughout the mall. Parts of the original Gimbels facade had collapsed and the walls were showing stress cracks. The walkway was no longer heated and the tiles were so broken and floor so uneven the heels of a shopper's shoes often caught in the floor.

Two tenants survived for the entire 42-year life of the mall, Valley Shoe Repair and Marc Anthony's Hair Salon.

Although some tenants supported keeping the mall open, North Versailles Township officials wanted to see the property cleared and replaced by new retail space or housing. It was also rumored that University of Pittsburgh Medical Center (UPMC) purchased the property in order to centralize their Braddock and McKeesport hospital locations. After a year of sitting vacant, the mall, including the theater, was razed in early 2007. Benderson Development Company, the company who owned the Eastland property at the time had proposed building a multi-use complex on the site tentatively known as "Eastland Centre", although as of 2015*, the former mall site remains undeveloped and the Benderson website no longer has Eastland listed on its portfolio.

In 2021, the former mall site was purchased by Amazon.

References

External links
Eastland Mall at deadmalls.com
New Yinzer magazine article with interior photos
Duquesne Hunky article
Video showing the visual history of the mall

Shopping malls in Metro Pittsburgh
Shopping malls established in 1963
Defunct shopping malls in the United States
Demolished shopping malls in the United States
1963 establishments in Pennsylvania
Shopping malls disestablished in 2005
Buildings and structures demolished in 2007
2005 disestablishments in Pennsylvania